Eklakhi may refer to:

Eklakhi, Hooghly, a village in Hooghly district, West Bengal, India
Eklakhi Junction railway station, Maldah district, West Bengal, India